Santiago Rosario (July 25, 1939 – September 6, 2013) was a first baseman and corner outfielder who played briefly for the Kansas City Athletics during the  season. Listed at 5' 11", 165 lb., Rosario batted and threw left handed. He was born in Guayanilla, Puerto Rico.

Career
At age 20 Rosario was selected for the baseball team that represented Puerto Rico at the 1959 Pan American Games held in Chicago, Illinois. This was a historical fact because it was the first time that a Puerto Rico baseball team participated in the Pan Am Games. ′′Chago′′, as his teammates dubbed him, helped offensively and defensively his team, which won a silver medal in the event as a runner-up for the Venezuelan squad.

Rosario was signed originally by the St. Louis Cardinals as an amateur free agent in 1960 and was sent to the Athletics in 1964. He hit a .235 batting average in 81 games for the Athletics, 47 of them in pinch-hitting duties.

He also spent parts of nine minor leagues spanning 1961–1971, collecting a .275 average with 49 home runs and 332 runs batted in through 1091 games. After that, he joined the Mexican League from 1973 through 1976, and also was a member of the Leones de Ponce Puerto Rican team that clinched the 1972 Caribbean Series.

Following his playing retirement, Rosario coached in the Puerto Rican league both for Ponce and the Indios de Mayagüez.

Pacific Coast League incident
During his playing career, Rosario was involved in a significantly more serious sequel to the Juan Marichal–John Roseboro brawl of August 1965.
 
In a Pacific Coast League game played on May 11, 1966, Merritt Ranew was catching for the Seattle Angels (a California Angels affiliate club) while Jim Coates was pitching against the Vancouver Mounties (a Kansas City A's affiliate).

The incident started when Coates hurled one high and tight pitch and struck Ricardo Joseph of Vancouver on the shoulder. Then, Joseph charged the mound but, before he could get to Coates, he was tackled from behind and had his chin bloodied by Ranew. The ensuing free-for-all finally subsided, but then Vancouver's Tommie Reynolds pushed a bunt up the first base line, which forced Coates to field the ball while Reynolds tried to run the pitcher down. Once more Ranew raced to the aid of Coates. Nevertheless, Rosario dashed from the on-deck circle and hit Ranew over the head with his bat, opening up a deep three-inch gash. Ranew suffered internal bleeding in the brain and the left side of his face was paralyzed.

Days later, PCL President Dewey Soriano fined all the participants in the incident and suspended Rosario for the remainder of the season. "Using a bat on a player is not part of baseball," Soriano stated.

References

External links

1939 births
2013 deaths
Baseball players at the 1959 Pan American Games
Birmingham A's players
Birmingham Barons players
Cardenales de Villahermosa players
Daytona Beach Islanders players
Diablos Rojos del México players
Kansas City Athletics players
Lancaster Red Roses players
Major League Baseball first basemen
Major League Baseball players from Puerto Rico
Mexican League baseball players
Pan American Games medalists in baseball
Pan American Games silver medalists for Puerto Rico
People from Guayanilla, Puerto Rico
Portsmouth-Norfolk Tides players
Puerto Rican expatriate baseball players in Canada
Puerto Rican expatriate baseball players in Mexico
Richmond Braves players
Rieleros de Aguascalientes players
Rojos del Águila de Veracruz players
Savannah Braves players
Shreveport Braves players
Tulsa Oilers (baseball) players
Vancouver Mounties players
Winnipeg Goldeyes players
Medalists at the 1959 Pan American Games